This is the list of highest-grossing films in the Soviet Union, in terms of box office admissions (ticket sales). It includes the highest-grossing films in the Soviet Union (USSR), the highest-grossing domestic Soviet films, the domestic films with the greatest number of ticket sales by year, and the highest-grossing foreign films in the Soviet Union. Note that, in line with the definition above, this list does not include any Soviet television series or television movies, which were not shown in cinemas of the Soviet Union.

The annual list includes sales during each year only, which often means that the total number of tickets sold was bigger. As an example, according to the list below the film The Red Snowball Tree, the top seller of the year 1974, sold 62.5 million tickets during that year. But the total number of sold tickets during all years was bigger; Boris Pavlenok, former deputy director of the USSR GosKino, estimated 140 million. This figure is comparable to some of the United States' all-time highest ticket sellers, such as The Sound of Music, E.T. the Extra-Terrestrial, and Titanic, exceeding the latter's estimated ticket sales of 135.5 million.

Soviet ticket prices were lower than American ticket prices, due to lower living costs in the Soviet Union.

Both domestic Soviet films and foreign films were shown, the latter having a limited quota and thus drawing higher average ticket sales than domestic productions. Indian films had the strongest presence in the foreign blockbuster charts for four decades, followed by American films. Foreign imports included 300 Indian films (most of which were Bollywood films), 41 American films (Hollywood), and 38 French films.

Highest-grossing films

Including re-runs

Initial runs

Highest-grossing by year

Highest-grossing domestic films

Including re-runs

Initial runs

Highest-grossing by year

Highest-grossing foreign films
This is a list of foreign films that sold the most tickets at the Soviet box office. Among the foreign films that sold more than 20 million tickets in the Soviet Union, 50 were Indian films (Bollywood), the highest from any nation, followed by 41 American films (Hollywood) and 38 French films.

Including re-runs

Initial runs

Highest-grossing by year

See also
Cinema of the Soviet Union
List of highest-grossing films
List of highest-grossing films in Russia
List of highest-grossing Indian films
List of highest-grossing Indian films in overseas markets
List of highest-grossing non-English films
Lists of highest-grossing films

Notes

References

External links

 
Soviet of the year by ticket sales